Rice flower is an ambiguous plant name which may refer to:

Pimelea plants

Pimelea spicata, rice flower
Pimelea spinescens subsp. spinescens, plains rice-flower or spiny rice-flower
Pimelea linifolia ssp. linifolia, slender rice-flower or flax-leafed riceflower

Other plants

Ozothamnus diosmifolius (syn. Helichrysum diosmifolium)
Aglaia odorata, Chinese rice flower (China)
Rice

Distinguish from
Rice flour